The Absheron Carpet Weaving School is one of the Azerbaijani carpet weaving schools. The school covers the Absheron villages: Goradil, Novkhani, Surakhani, Khilibuta, Nardaran, Bulbul, Fatmai, Mardakan, Qala, Khila, as well as the Khyzy region. Such centers of carpet weaving as Gadi, Khil, Kesh, Fyndygan and others are also known.

Carpets of the Absheron school

Characteristic 
The carpets are characterized by softness and intensity of colors, original geometric patterns. The geometric patterns and images of plants are often associated with the decorations of these carpets.

Most of the carpets bear the names of the places and villages where they were woven. Examples of such carpets are such famous compositions as Khilabuta, Hila-Afshan, Novkhani, Surakhani, Kala, Baky, Goradil, Fatmai, Fyndygan, Gadi, etc. One of the best products of the Baku carpet weaving school is the "Zili" carpet, woven in a manner similar to the "Shadda" carpet.

The style of the Absheron carpets is rather loose, the weaving is of medium fineness, the base is woolen and cotton, the wool is good and soft to the touch, the shuttle is tied with a double thread, the knot is symmetrical. The Absheron carpets are characterized by pale, almost transparent colors, harmonious combinations of blue, light blue, beige, ivory, yellow, chocolate and pure red tones.

Gallery

See also 
 Quba rugs and carpets
 Ganja rugs

References

Azerbaijani rugs and carpets
Azerbaijani culture